The Hungary national under-21 football team is the national under-21 football team for Hungary and is controlled by the Hungarian Football Federation.

Following the realignment of UEFA's youth competitions in 1976, the Hungarian Under-21 team was formed.  The team has a modest record, reaching the last eight of three tournaments, and the semi-finals of one, but failing to qualify for eleven, including the forthcoming 2006 tournament.

Since the under-21 competition rules insist that players must be 21 or under at the start of a two-year competition, technically it is an U-23 competition. For this reason, Hungary's excellent record in the preceding U-23 competitions is also shown.

Olympics record

UEFA U-23 Championship record 
 1972: Did not qualify. Finished 2nd of 3 in qualification group.
 1974: Winners.
 1976: Runners-up.

UEFA U-21 Championship record 
 1978: Losing quarter-finalists.
 1980: Losing quarter-finalists.
 1982: Did not qualify. Finished 2nd of 4 in qualification group.
 1984: Did not qualify. Finished 3rd of 4 in qualification group.
 1986: Losing semi-finalists.
 1988: Did not qualify. Finished 2nd of 4 in qualification group.
 1990: Did not qualify. Finished 2nd of 3 in qualification group.
 1992: Did not qualify. Finished 4th of 4 in qualification group.
 1994: Did not qualify. Finished 4th of 5 in qualification group.
 1996: Losing quarter-finalists.
 1998: Did not qualify. Finished 5th of 5 in qualification group.
 2000: Did not qualify. Finished 4th of 5 in qualification group.
 2002: Did not qualify. Finished 3rd of 5 in qualification group.
 2004: Did not qualify. Finished 3rd of 5 in qualification group.
 2006: Play-off stage.
 2007: Did not qualify. Finished 2nd of 3 in qualification group.
 2009: Did not qualify. Finished 3rd of 5 in qualification group.
 2011: Did not qualify. Finished 3rd of 5 in qualification group.
 2013: Did not qualify. Finished 4th of 5 in qualification group.
 2015: Did not qualify. Finished 3rd of 5 in qualification group.
 2017: Did not qualify. Finished 5th of 6 in qualification group.
 2019: Did not qualify. Finished 4th of 6 in qualification group.
 2021: Group stage.
 2023: Did not qualify. Finished 4th of 6 in qualification group.

UEFA European Under-21 Football Championship

2023 UEFA European Under-21 Championship qualification

Results and fixtures

Players

Current squad
 The following players were called up for the September 2022 friendly matches.
 Match dates: 23 and 27 September 2022
 Opposition:  and 
 Caps and goals correct as of:' 27 September 2022, after the match against 

Recent callups
The following players have been selected by Hungary in the past 12 months.

Notes
INJ = Player withdrew from the squad due to an injury
Names in italics'' denote players that have been capped for the Senior team.

Staff

Technical staff

Administrative staff

See also 
 Hungary national football team
 Hungary national under-19 football team
 Hungary national under-17 football team
 European Under-21 Football Championship

References

External links
 UEFA Under-21 website Contains full results archive
Hungarian Football Forum (In English)
 The Rec.Sport.Soccer Statistics Foundation Contains full record of U-21/U-23 Championships.

European national under-21 association football teams
under-21